The Open Jezequel was a golf tournament on the Challenge Tour, held 1993–1994 in France.

Winners

References

External links
Coverage on the Challenge Tour's official site

Former Challenge Tour events
Defunct golf tournaments in France